Poundit is a privately held online e-commerce website based in the Philippines. The website was founded by former BlackBerry Philippines manager Kristian Salvo in 2014. It headquartered in Makati, Philippines. The company set up an end-to-end solution for the Philippine market including sales, electronics, gadgets, home appliances, and accessories.

Funding
In September 2017, Poundit has received  worth of operating budget from the Singapore venture capital Cocoon, which helped it to grow its online business in the Philippines.

References

Online retailers of the Philippines
Retail companies established in 2014
Internet properties established in 2014